William Powlett may refer to:

 Lord William Powlett (c.1663/7–1729), British politician who represented Lymington and Winchester
 William Powlett (MP) (c.1693–1757), son of the above, British politician who represented Lymington, Winchester and Whitchurch
 William Vane, 3rd Duke of Cleveland (1792–1864), British politician known as "Lord William Powlett" from 1809 to 1864
 William Powlett Powlett, English landowner and politician
 Lord William Paulet (1804–1894), British field marshal

See also
William Orde-Powlett, 5th Baron Bolton